Damagaram Takaya is a village and rural Department  in Niger.

References

Communes of Niger